HC Prešov Penguins was an ice hockey team played in the 1. Liga, the second level of Slovak ice hockey, and were formed in 1928. They played in the city of Prešov, Slovakia at Ice Arena Prešov.

Honours

Domestic

Slovak 1. Liga
  Runners-up (2): 1997–98, 2009–10
  3rd place (7): 1996–97, 2000–01, 2002–03, 2003–04, 2012–13, 2016–17, 2017–18

Slovak Hockey League
  Runners-up (2): 1939–40, 1940–41

History
The club was founded in 1928 as Snaha Prešov. They changed their name many times since:

 1931 – Slávia Prešov
 1952 – ČSSZ Prešov
 1953 – DŠO Tatran Prešov
 1964 – Tatran Prešov
 1968 – VTJ Dukla Prešov
 1970 – ZPA Prešov
 1970 – Sedlo Aréna
 1994 – Dragon Prešov
 1997 – HK VTJ Prešov
 1998 – HK VTJ Farmakol Prešov
 2003 – PHK Prešov
 2006 – HK Lietajúce kone Prešov
 2007 – HC 07 Prešov 
 2014 – PHK 3b Prešov 
 2015 – HC Prešov Penguins

Achievements
Promoted to the Slovak Extraliga: 1998
Slovak 1.Liga champion: 2004

Notable players
 Igor Liba

References

External links
 Official website 
 

Sport in Prešov
Prešov
1928 establishments in Slovakia